Unionville is the name of some places in the U.S. state of Pennsylvania:

Unionville, Berks County, Pennsylvania
Unionville, Butler County, Pennsylvania
Unionville, Centre County, Pennsylvania
Unionville, Chester County, Pennsylvania
Unionville, Montgomery County, Pennsylvania
Neffs, Pennsylvania in Lehigh County, historically called Unionville